Mushfiqur Rahman is a Bangladesh Nationalist Party politician and the former Member of Parliament of Brahmanbaria-4.

Career
Mushfiq Ur Rahman was elected to parliament from Brahmanbaria-4 as a Bangladesh Nationalist Party candidate in 2001. He was nominated for the 11th Jatiya Sansad election but his nomination was cancelled by the Bangladesh Election Commission.

References

Bangladesh Nationalist Party politicians
Living people
8th Jatiya Sangsad members
Year of birth missing (living people)